Wotans Throne is a  summit located in the Grand Canyon, in Coconino County of Arizona, US. It is situated one mile immediately southwest of the Cape Royal overlook on the canyon's North Rim, 1.7 mile west-southwest of Freya Castle, two miles west-northwest of Vishnu Temple, and five miles east of Zoroaster Temple.

Wotans Throne is named for Wotan, the supreme Germanic deity. This name was applied by geologist François E. Matthes, in keeping with Clarence Dutton's practice of naming geographical features in the Grand Canyon after mythological deities. This geographical feature's name was officially adopted in 1906 by the U.S. Board on Geographic Names. According to the Köppen climate classification system, Wotans Throne is located in a Cold semi-arid climate zone.

Geology

The wooded top of Wotans Throne is composed of 700-feet-thick Kaibab Limestone overlaying 300-feet-thick, cream-colored, cliff-forming, Permian Coconino Sandstone. The sandstone, which is the third-youngest of the strata in the Grand Canyon, was deposited 265 million years ago as sand dunes. Below the Coconino Sandstone is slope-forming, Permian Hermit Formation, which in turn overlays the Pennsylvanian-Permian Supai Group. Further down are strata of Mississippian Redwall Limestone, Cambrian Tonto Group, and finally Proterozoic Unkar Group at creek level. Precipitation runoff from Wotans Throne drains south to the Colorado River via Vishnu Creek on its east side, and Clear Creek on the west side.

Gallery

See also
 Geology of the Grand Canyon area
 Cape Royal

References

External links 

 Weather forecast: National Weather Service
 Wotans Throne photo by Harvey Butchart

Grand Canyon
Landforms of Coconino County, Arizona
Mountains of Arizona
Mountains of Coconino County, Arizona
North American 2000 m summits
Colorado Plateau
Grand Canyon National Park
Grand Canyon, North Rim